Dariel Alejandro Morejón Rodríguez (born 22 December 1998) is a Cuban football player. He plays for Villa Clara.

International
He made his Cuba national football team debut on 26 August 2018 in a friendly against Barbados, as a 79th-minute substitute for Yosel Piedra.

He was selected for his country's 2019 CONCACAF Gold Cup squad.

References

External links
 
 

Living people
1998 births
Cuban footballers
Cuba international footballers
Association football defenders
FC Villa Clara players
FC Ciego de Ávila players
2019 CONCACAF Gold Cup players
People from Santa Clara, Cuba
21st-century Cuban people